Battle Trek is a video game written by Gilman Louie for the TRS-80 published by Voyager Software in 1981. An Atari 8-bit family version followed in 1982.

Gameplay
Battle Trek is a game in which the player commands the starship USS Ranger against the enemy Vegans.

Reception
Hosea Battles, Jr. reviewed the game for Computer Gaming World, and stated that "The game is quite exciting. I was constantly torn between redistributing power and firing weapons."

References

External links
Article in Softline

1981 video games
Atari 8-bit family games
TRS-80 games